Sultan Ismail LRT station is a rapid transit station in Kuala Lumpur, Malaysia, operated by RapidKL served by the Ampang Line and Sri Petaling Line. This station was opened in 1996, along with 17 other LRT stations, as Phase 1 of the STAR LRT Line. It was the terminus of the Ampang-Sultan Ismail route before the extension to Sentul Timur. The Sultan Ismail LRT station stands between Sekolah Kebangsaan Lelaki Jalan Batu and Chung Kwok Primary School. The Malaysia's leading multinational conglomerate Sime Darby head office is opposite of this station. There is an artist impression of the station erected at SK Lelaki Jalan Batu.

Interchanges
This station is connected to the  Medan Tuanku Monorail station, about 580 m away, by a pedestrian bridge.

Station layout
The station is a typical elevated Ampang and Sri Petaling Lines station, the platform level is on the topmost floor, consisting of two sheltered side platforms along a double tracked line; there is a single concourse housing ticketing facilities between the ground level and the platform level. The design is similar to that of most other stations on the line, with multi-tiered roofs supported by latticed frames, and white plastered walls and pillars. All levels are linked by stairways and escalators.

Around the station
 Kuala Lumpur Metropolitan University College
 Maju Junction Mall

See also

 List of rail transit stations in Klang Valley

References

Ampang Line
Railway stations opened in 1996
1996 establishments in Malaysia